Torbjørn Ringdal Hansen (born 1 March 1979 in Røyken) is a Norwegian chess player.
 

He achieved the title International Master in 2008, and was awarded the Grandmaster title in 2015.
 
Hansen was the first coach of later World Champion Magnus Carlsen, from 2000 to 2001, when Hansen served a one-year alternative civilian service programme at the Norwegian College of Elite Sport. Carlsen was nine years old at the time, and trained chess in a group along with two other children, organized by Hansen. Carlsen's rating improved from about 900 to 1,900 during this one-year period.

Hansen achieved his first Grandmaster norm in the 2003/04 Rilton Cup in Stockholm, with subsequent norms in the Norwegian Premier League in 2007/08 and in Almeria in 2011. He was designated IM in 2008 and GM in 2015.

References

1979 births
Living people
Norwegian chess players
Chess grandmasters
Chess coaches